Caroline Kennedy-Pipe (born 1961) is a British political scientist, a military historian, and an expert on War Studies whose research interests include the contemporary history of war, the ethics of war, Cold War politics, terrorism, and Russian foreign policy. She is President of the British International Studies Association (BISA) and she was Chair of the BISA from 2004 to 2006.

Since 2018, she has been a professor of International Relations (IR) and International Security at the School of Social, Political and Geographical Sciences, Loughborough University. Prior to joining the Loughborough University, she was a professor of War Studies and Director of the Centre for Security Studies at the University of Hull.

Academic career 
In 2018, Kennedy-Pipe was Visiting Fellow at the Rothermere Institute, University of Oxford and from 2018 to 2019 she was a Specialist Advisor to the House of Commons Defence Committee.

She was Chair of War Studies at the University of Warwick and had been Chair of IR, University of Sheffield. Her previous teaching posts include Reader in Politics at the Durham University and Director of the Institute for International Studies at the University of Leeds.

Works
Terrorism and Political Violence (2015)
The Origins of the Present Troubles in Northern Ireland (2014)
Security Studies: the Basics (2013)
Russia and the World 1917-1991 (2011)
The Origins of the Cold War (2007)
International Security Issues in a Global Age: Securing the Twenty-first Century (2000) with Clive Jones
Death from Above: The Evolution of Drone Warfare (1999) with James Rogers
Stalin's Cold War: Soviet Strategies in Europe, 1943 to 1956 (1995)

External links

References 

1961 births
Living people
British political scientists
Women political scientists
British military historians
20th-century British historians
20th-century British women writers
21st-century British historians
21st-century British women writers
British women historians
Academics of Loughborough University
Academics of the University of Hull
Academics of the University of Warwick
Academics of the University of Sheffield
Academics of Durham University
Academics of the University of Leeds